Cai Jinbiao (born 1954) is a former Chinese international footballer who played as a defender. He represented Guangdong FC where he won the 1979 Chinese league title as well as playing for the Chinese national football team in the 1980 Asian Cup.

Playing career 
At an early age Cai Jinbiao would be accepted in a specialist sports school within Xingning, Guangdong before he started his career playing for the Guangdong youth team where he would soon be promoted to the senior team in 1974. Despite his relatively short height for a defender he would go on to establish himself as an extremely effective defender and receive the nickname "Steel head" by the local fans. He would soon receive his first call-up to the Chinese national team by the manager Nian Weisi while back at his club Cai's free-kick skills and jumping ability would then go on to see Guangdong FC win their first ever Chinese league title at the end of the 1979 league season.

Career statistics

International statistics

Honours 
Guangdong FC
 China national league: 1979

References

External links
 Team China Stats

1954 births
Living people
Chinese footballers
China international footballers
Footballers from Meizhou
Hakka sportspeople
People from Xingning
Guangdong Winnerway F.C. players
1976 AFC Asian Cup players
1980 AFC Asian Cup players
Association football defenders